Franko Škugor was the defending champion but decided not to participate.

Farrukh Dustov won against Yang Tsung-hua in the final (6–1, 7–6(7–4)) and win the title.

Seeds

Draw

Finals

Top half

Bottom half

References
 Main Draw
 Qualifying Draw

Beijing International Challenger - Singles
2011 Men's Singles